Dude, Where's My Car? is a 2000 American stoner comedy film directed by Danny Leiner. The film stars Ashton Kutcher and Seann William Scott as two best friends who find themselves unable to remember where they parked their vehicle after a night of recklessness. Supporting cast members include Kristy Swanson, Jennifer Garner, and Marla Sokoloff.
Though the film was panned by most critics, it was a box office success and has managed to achieve a cult status, partially from frequent airings on cable television. The film's title became a minor pop-culture saying, and was commonly reworked in various pop-cultural contexts during the 2000s.

Plot
Best friends and roommates Jesse and Chester awaken with hangovers and no memory of the previous night. Their television is on, showing a program about animals using twigs and rocks as tools to get food. In the program is a monkey nicknamed Andrew. Their refrigerator is filled with containers of chocolate pudding, and the answering machine contains an angry message from their twin girlfriends Wilma and Wanda as to their whereabouts. The two also learn they have almost been fired from their jobs. They emerge from their home to find Jesse's car missing and with it their girlfriends' first-anniversary presents. This prompts Jesse to ask the film's titular question: "Dude, where's my car?"

Because the girls have promised them a "special treat", which Jesse and Chester take to mean sexual intercourse, the men are desperate to retrieve their car. The duo begins retracing their steps in an attempt to discover where they left the car. Along the way, they encounter a transgender stripper, a belligerent speaker box operator at a Chinese restaurant's drive-through, two tattoos they discover on each other's backs, UFO cultists led by Zoltan (who later hold the twins' hostage), a Cantonese-speaking Chinese tailor, the Zen-minded Nelson and his cannabis-loving dog Jackal, beautiful Christie Boner, her aggressive jock boyfriend Tommy and his friends, a couple of hard-nosed police detectives, and a reclusive French ostrich farmer named Pierre. They also meet two groups of aliens, one group being five gorgeous women, the other being two Norwegian men, searching for the "Continuum Transfunctioner": an extraterrestrial device that the boys accidentally picked up last night.

After Pierre releases the duo for correctly answering a question about ostriches, Jesse and Chester head over to a local arcade named Captain Stu's Space-O-Rama. Once inside, they encounter Zoltan and his cultists who give them Wilma and Wanda in exchange for a toy that Jesse and Chester try to pass off as the Transfunctioner. Tommy, Christie, and the jocks arrive along with Nelson and his dog, whom they release after Tommy snatches the fake Transfunctioner from Zoltan. The two sets of aliens arrive and notify everyone of the real Continuum Transfunctioner: a Rubik's Cube that Chester has been working hard to solve. He then solves it on the spot, causing the device to shapeshift into its true form.

The boys are warned that once the five lights stop flashing, the universe will be destroyed. Jesse and Chester must determine which group of aliens is there to protect the universe and which is there to destroy it. Both claim to be the protectors of the universe, stating that they were with Jesse and Chester the previous night, which Jesse and Chester still cannot remember anything, and ask for the Transfunctioner. The two correctly choose the men, who answer their question about the previous night by stating they got a hole-in-one at the 18th hole at the arcade's miniature golf park and won a lifetime supply of pudding. At the last second, they deactivate the Transfunctioner, saving the universe.

Enraged, the five alien women merge to transform into its true form, a beautiful 50-foot giantess clad in a purple bra and matching miniskirt. She devours Tommy alive in front of Christie, who reacts with indifference. The giantess then crawls out of the amusement center and chases Jesse and Chester. The cultists tell them to activate the Photon Accelerator Annihilation Beam on the Transfunctioner. However, the button that activates it is too far in to reach. At the last second, Chester remembers the nature show with the tool-using chimpanzees and uses a straw to push the recessed button, thus destroying the alien. Tommy survives, but Christie breaks up with him in favor of Nelson.

The protectors thank Jesse, Chester, and the twins for saving the world, and erase their minds concerning the events. The protectors park the duo's car, a Renault Le Car, behind a mail truck for them to find the following morning. Jesse and Chester salvage their relationships with the twins and discover the special treat from the girls turns out to be matching berets with Jesse and Chester's names embroidered in the front. The protectors leave a gift for their girlfriends (and, for the two men): Breast Enhancement Necklaces. Jesse, Chester, and the twins go out for Chinese food in Jesse's car, while arguing about what their tattoos say.

Cast

Production
Seth Rogen and Jake Gyllenhaal both auditioned for the lead roles. Jason Reitman turned down the offer to direct the film twice. Principal photography took place in North Hollywood, Santa Clarita, and Glendale, California. Scenes containing the fictional restaurant "Chinese Foooood" were filmed in Burbank, California.

Release

Critical response
On Rotten Tomatoes, Dude, Where's My Car? has an approval rating of 17% based on reviews from 58 critics, with an average rating of 3.59/10. The site's critical consensus reads, "The movie isn't funny, the plot is too thin, and the production values feel more like a TV sitcom than a movie." On Metacritic, the film has a weighted average score of 30 out of 100, based on 17 critics, indicating "generally unfavorable reviews". Audiences polled by CinemaScore gave the film an average grade of "B−" on an A+ to F scale.

The BBC Films review gave it 1 star, calling the film "a lame-brained travesty" and "intensely irritating", and Kutcher and Scott's routines "painfully unamusing". USA Today said: "Any civilization that can produce a movie this stupid probably deserves to be hit by famine and pestilence." The Chicago Tribune said: "At the end of 83 unmerciful minutes, audiences will be exclaiming, 'Dude, I can't believe I sat through that movie!?'" and the New York Post said that it was: "An almost chuckle-free mess, so amateurish and lame that the cast often has that embarrassed look you see on dogs given ridiculous haircuts." However, the New York Daily News did praise the "surprisingly sweet-natured pairing" of Kutcher and Scott. In 2014, Adam Boult of The Guardian listed the film as a "guilty pleasure", saying Kutcher and Scott were underrated as comedic performers and while the film overall was disjointed, it was nonetheless "packed with so many throw-away gags and Dadaist one liners it’s impossible to absorb them all in a single sitting".

Box office
The film opened at number 2 at the North American box office, grossing US$13.8 million in its opening weekend behind What Women Want, which opened at the top spot with US$33 million. Its overall gross came to $46 million in the US and $73.2 million in total worldwide from a $13 million budget.

Home media
The DVD was released on June 26, 2001, with 7 deleted and extended scenes, an audio commentary with Kutcher, Scott, and Leiner, a behind-the-scenes featurette, the music video for Grand Theft Audio's "Stoopid Ass", TV spots, and the theatrical trailer. The VHS version was released on November 6, 2001. The film was later released on Blu-ray; the only special feature is the inclusion of the original theatrical trailer.

Music

The soundtrack for the film was released December 15, 2000, by London Import.

Soundtrack
"Stoopid Ass" – Grand Theft Audio
"Playmate of the Year" – Zebrahead
"Lighting the Way" – Superdrag
"I'm Afraid of Britney Spears" – Liveonrelease
"Authenticity" – Harvey Danger
"Voodoo Lady" – Ween
"Listen to the Music" – Dangerman
"So Cal Loco (Party Like a Rockstar)" – Sprung Monkey
"We Luv U" – Grand Theft Audio
"Lunatic" – Silt
"Sorry About Your Luck" – Spy
"Bust a Move" – Young MC

Other songs
Songs featured in the film but not included in the soundtrack
"It Could Be You" – Blur
"Come On, Come On" – Smash Mouth
"You Sexy Thing" – Hot Chocolate
"Claire Danes Poster" – Size 14
"Let it Ride" – Spy
"Right Now" – SR-71
"American Psycho" – Treble Charger
"Here We Go" (Radio Edit) - Freestylers
"The Bubble Bunch" – Jimmy Spicer
"Zoltan's Theme" – turtle?
"Little Things" – Good Charlotte
"What I Believe" – Sum 41
"Bakhuphuka Izwe Lonke" – Ladysmith Black Mambazo
"Sitar Dude" – Terry Wilson
"Pachelbel's Canon" – written by Johann Pachelbel, arranged by Lee Ashley
"La Marseillaise" – written by Claude Joseph Rouget de Lisle

Legacy

In 2012, the Pittsburgh Pirates started using the "Zoltan" hand signal from the film as a way for players to congratulate their teammates after an accomplishment such as a home run or a double play. The habit started after the Pirates (in particular Neil Walker) were watching Dude, Where's My Car? in the visiting clubhouse at Turner Field in Atlanta during an April 2012 weekend series against the Atlanta Braves. After a Twitter campaign to encourage the "real" Zoltan to appear at a game, Hal Sparks flew to Pittsburgh on July 25, 2012, to throw out the ceremonial first pitch, and was on hand to see the Pirates win 3–2 over his hometown team, the Chicago Cubs. Also there to support the team was Hal's girlfriend, Summer Soltis, whose family is from the area and are Pirates fans themselves. Despite picking up a cult following in Pittsburgh and helping the team contend in the playoff race well into September, the Pirates finished with a 79–83 record, extending their major North American professional sports record to 20 consecutive losing seasons.

Possible sequel
A sequel titled Seriously Dude, Where's My Car? was in development for years, but never materialized. In 2016, Kutcher confirmed the existence of a script for Seriously Dude, Where's My Car? and further elaborated that he would not be completely against reprising his role in the sequel. In August 2017, Scott discussed his interest in making a sequel and that he would desire it to be rated R and "dark and really weird".

References

External links

20th Century Fox films
Films about automobiles
American films about cannabis
Films about extraterrestrial life
Films about giants
American buddy comedy films
Films directed by Danny Leiner
Films scored by David Kitay
Films shot in Los Angeles
Stoner films
2000s buddy comedy films
2000 comedy films
2000s English-language films
2000s American films